Omar Abdulrazaq (born March 12, 1987 in Syria) is a football player who is currently playing for Sitra Club in the Bahraini Premier League.

References

External links
 Career stats at goalzz.com

1987 births
Living people
Syrian footballers
Association football forwards
Syrian expatriate footballers
Expatriate footballers in Bahrain
Expatriate footballers in Jordan
Expatriate footballers in Yemen
Syrian expatriate sportspeople in Bahrain
Syrian expatriate sportspeople in Jordan
Syrian Premier League players
Bahraini Premier League players
Al-Jalil players
Sitra Club players
Shabab Al-Hussein SC players
Tishreen SC players